Phase One Karma is an IT company that devises products based on artificial intelligence technologies. The company produced Unicheck (a part of Turnitin since 2020), a cloud-based plagiarism detection software, and Loio, a document optimization add-in for legal professionals.

History 
 
Phase One Karma was founded in 2014 to create a meaningful impact through developing innovative software products. In 2014 Unicheck (Unplag until 2017) became the company's first machine Learning (ML) and natural language processing based product to confront student plagiarism in schools and universities. In 2019 Unicheck became a thriving technology product, reaching over 1 million users in more than 90 countries. In 2020, Unicheck was acquired by Turnitin to improve innovative technologies in education and administration.

As part of the internal R&D department, the P1K team developed EMMA, an authorship verification algorithm, to combat plagiarism. EMMA is based on Natural language understanding (NLU) technology, determining authorship through the writing style verification. The algorithm was integrated into Unicheck. EMMA defines the authorship of the text with a probability of 92%, using only three texts of 300 to 1000 words each. At the development stage, EMMA was tested on texts in The Washington Post, The New York Times, The Daily Telegraph, The Times, The Wall Street Journal, and others 

From 2019 onwards, Phase One Karma is working on the development of different AI projects that would become just as significant and applicable. The company is producing Loio, a legal technology  MS Word add-in for legal professionals, to transform the routine tiresome digital paperwork for lawyers. Loio offers the features of legal document styling, numbering, tracking of contract versions, and up-to-date AI-analysis. Its mission is to eradicate any errors and plagiarism that is viable to take place due to the ongoing work stress in legal professions.

Corporate identity and acknowledgments 
 
Phase One Karma has a distinct corporate culture and an integrated community of coworkers. The company's main asset is its team. Phase One Karma's corporate values are representatives of synergy for dynamic work and effective HR-management. The company is focused on being ecologically aware and sends aid to the local rescue services. During the 2020 global pandemic's lockdown, the company implemented the required preventive measures and transferred the team to remote work with the necessary equipment.
 
Phase One Karma Research and Development department has been acknowledged as highly professional and supportive while devising, testing, and implementing of AI paraphrase identification method.

See also 
 Educational technology

References

External links 
 Phase One Karma official website

Software companies of Ukraine